"Money's Too Tight (to Mention)" (sometimes stylized as "Money$ Too Tight (to Mention)" in some of its single and album releases) is a song written and first recorded by The Valentine Brothers, John Valentine and Billy Valentine, and released as a single in 1982. The song was ranked at number 6 among the top ten "Tracks of the Year" for 1982 by NME.

It was covered by the British pop/soul group Simply Red in 1985 as their debut single. The Valentine Brothers' version peaked at #41 on the Billboard R&B charts, while the Simply Red single went to #13 on the UK charts in July 1985 and #28 on the Billboard US pop chart in 1986. It was Simply Red's first UK single. The song was also an international hit, reaching the top 40 in several countries.

The lyrics concern a person with economic problems, and mention Reaganomics, a set of economic policies implemented by U.S. president Ronald Reagan in order to encourage the growth of the American economy.  The lyrics include the lines "the old man that's over the hill", and "did the earth move for you, Nancy?" He wants to borrow money, first from his brother who responds,"Brother I'd like to help you but I'm unable to", then to his "Father, Father, almighty Father" who then responds "Money's too tight to mention".

A pastiche of the song was recorded and used as the theme song for the Australian investment television program Money (1993–2002). Another pastiche was recorded for Bo Selecta in segments featuring Leigh Francis's impression of Hucknall.

Track listings 
 7" single
 Money's Too Tight (To Mention) 3:38	
 (Open Up the) Red Box 3:55

 12" single
 Money's Too Tight (To Mention) (The Cutback Mix) 8:40
 Money's Too Tight (To Mention) (Single Version) 3:38
 Money's Too Tight (To Mention) (Dub Version) 6:43

Charts

Valentine Brothers version

Simply Red version

See also
Ronald Reagan in music

References

1985 debut singles
Simply Red songs
Songs about poverty
Songs about Ronald Reagan
1982 songs
Elektra Records singles